The molecular formula C17H20N2O2 may refer to:
 Tropisetron, a serotonin 5-HT3 receptor antagonist
 Tropicamide, a medication used to dilate the pupil and help with examination of the eye